The 2010 Big 12 Conference baseball tournament is held at AT&T Bricktown Ballpark in Oklahoma City, OK from May 26th to May 30th, 2010. This is the fifth year the conference uses the round robin tournament setup. The winners of each group at the end of the round robin face each other in a one-game match for the championship. The  Texas A&M Aggies defeated the Baylor Bears 5–3 to win the championship.

Regular Season Standings
Source:

Colorado and Iowa State did not sponsor baseball teams.

Tournament

Oklahoma State and Nebraska did not make the tournament.
Oklahoma vs. Kansas State game ended after 8 innings due to run rule.
Texas A&M won the pregame coin flip to determine the home team in the championship game.
Texas A&M won the  championship game in 10 innings.

All-Tournament Team

See also
College World Series
2010 College World Series
NCAA Division I Baseball Championship
2010 NCAA Division I baseball tournament
Big 12 Conference baseball tournament

References

2010 Big 12 Tournament

Tournament
Big 12 Conference Baseball Tournament
Big 12 Conference baseball tournament
Big 12 Conference baseball tournament
Baseball competitions in Oklahoma City
College sports tournaments in Oklahoma